

This is a list of the National Register of Historic Places listings in Leelanau County, Michigan.

This is intended to be a complete list of the properties and districts on the National Register of Historic Places in Leelanau County, Michigan, United States. The locations of National Register properties and districts for which the latitude and longitude coordinates are included below, may be seen in a map.

There are 24 properties and districts listed on the National Register in the county, including 1 National Historic Landmark.

Listings county-wide

|}

See also

 List of Michigan State Historic Sites in Leelanau County, Michigan
 List of National Historic Landmarks in Michigan
 National Register of Historic Places listings in Michigan
 Listings in neighboring counties: Benzie, Grand Traverse

References

Leelanau
 
Buildings and structures in Leelanau County, Michigan